Marcellin Dègnon Koukpo (born 6 April 1995) is a Beninese international footballer who plays for Algerian club CS Constantine, as a striker.

Club career
Koukpo signed for Algerian club CR Belouizdad in September 2020 on a three-year contract.

In 2021, Koukpo signed a two-year contract with CS Constantine.

International career
At the youth level he played in 2015 African U-20 Championship qualifiers.

International goals
Scores and results list Benin's goal tally first.

References

1995 births
Living people
Beninese footballers
Benin international footballers
Benin under-20 international footballers
Energie FC players
USS Kraké players
Buffles du Borgou FC players
CS Hammam-Lif players
CR Belouizdad players
Association football forwards
Beninese expatriate footballers
Beninese expatriate sportspeople in Tunisia
Expatriate footballers in Tunisia
Beninese expatriates in Algeria
Expatriate footballers in Algeria
Tunisian Ligue Professionnelle 1 players
People from Cotonou
CS Constantine players